The 2002 FA Trophy Final was the 33rd final of the Football Association's cup competition for levels 5–8 of the English football league system. The match was contested by Stevenage Borough and Yeovil Town on 12 May 2002 at Villa Park in Birmingham.

Yeovil won the match 2–0 to win the competition for the first time in their history.

Match

Details

References

FA Trophy Finals
FA Trophy Final
FA Trophy Final 2002
FA Trophy Final 2002
May 2002 sports events in the United Kingdom